Mortaritaville may refer to:
Logistics Base Seitz, commonly known as Log Base Seitz, near Baghdad International Airport
Logistics Support Area Anaconda, near Balad, Iraq